Nicky, Ricky, Dicky & Dawn is an American comedy television series developed by Michael Feldman and created by Matt Fleckenstein that aired on Nickelodeon from September 13, 2014 to August 4, 2018. The series stars Brian Stepanek, Allison Munn, Aidan Gallagher, Casey Simpson, Mace Coronel, Lizzy Greene, Gabrielle Elyse, and Kyla-Drew Simmons.

Series overview

Episodes

Season 1 (2014–15)

Season 2 (2015–16)

Season 3 (2017)

Season 4 (2018)

References 

Lists of American children's television series episodes
Lists of American comedy television series episodes
Lists of Nickelodeon television series episodes